Southwest University of Visual Arts (SUVA) was a private art school in Tucson, Arizona, with a branch in Albuquerque, New Mexico.

Founded in 1983, SUVA was formerly known as The Art Center Design College, but changed its name in 2011. It was accredited by the North Central Association of Colleges and Schools.

Southwest University of Visual Arts officially closed on November 30, 2020, and ceased operations on December 18, 2020. It resigned its accreditation status effective December 23, 2020.

References

Art schools in Arizona
Art schools in New Mexico
Educational institutions established in 1983
2020 disestablishments in Arizona
2020 disestablishments in New Mexico
Defunct private universities and colleges in Arizona
Defunct private universities and colleges in New Mexico
Educational institutions disestablished in 2020